William Traher (1908-1984) was an American painter and muralist. He painted a mural in the DeWitt Post Office in DeWitt, Arkansas. His work was exhibited at the Museum of Modern Art in 1936.

References

1908 births
1984 deaths
People from Rock Springs, Wyoming
Artists from Wyoming
American male painters
American muralists

Section of Painting and Sculpture artists
20th-century American painters
20th-century American male artists